Humberto Daniel Soares Martelo , commonly known as  Humberto Foguinho , (born 31 October 1978) is a Brazilian footballer.

Humberto Foguinho previously played for Ponte Preta, Coritiba and Internacional in the Campeonato Brasileiro Série A.

References

1978 births
Living people
Brazilian footballers
Brazilian expatriate footballers
Associação Atlética Ponte Preta players
Coritiba Foot Ball Club players
Sport Club Internacional players
Esporte Clube Santo André players
Torino F.C. players
Maccabi Netanya F.C. players
Serie B players
Israeli Premier League players
Expatriate footballers in Italy
Expatriate footballers in Israel
Brazilian expatriate sportspeople in Israel
Association football midfielders
Sportspeople from Campinas